is a 1967 Japanese drama film directed by Noboru Nakamura. It is based both on the poetry collection Chieko-shō by Japanese poet and sculptor Kōtarō Takamura, which reminisces about his wife Chieko, and on the novel Shōsetsu Chieko-shō by Haruo Satō. The film was nominated for the Academy Award for Best International Feature Film.

Cast
 Shima Iwashita as Chieko Takamura
 Tetsurō Tanba as Kōtarō Takamura
 Jin Nakayama as Toyochika Takamura
 Yōko Minamida as Kazuko Tsubaki
 Eiji Okada as Tsubaki
 Mikijirō Hira as Ishii
 Kaori Shima as Fumiko
 Takamaru Sasaki as Takamura Kōun
 Tetsuo Ishidate as Tarō
 Kinuko Obata as Osato Sawada
 Yoshi Katō as Sōkichi Naganuma
 Poems read by Hiroshi Akutagawa

Reception
In a contemporary review, "Whit." of Variety described Portrait of Chieko as an "Exquisitely beautiful Japanese film", noting that Shima Iwashita "delivers a finely restrained performance of Oscar proportions, catching every nuance of character with consummate acting skill". The review went on to praise the cinematography by Hiroshi Takemura, Tatsuo Homada's art direction and Masaru Satō's score.

Other adaptations
Takamura's poems had already been adapted for film in 1957. The film, also titled Chieko-shō, had been directed by Hisatora Kumagai and starred Sō Yamamura and Setsuko Hara.

See also
 List of submissions to the 40th Academy Awards for Best Foreign Language Film
 List of Japanese submissions for the Academy Award for Best Foreign Language Film

References

External links

1967 films
1967 drama films
Japanese drama films
Films directed by Noboru Nakamura
Films based on poems
1960s Japanese films
1960s Japanese-language films